Cumberland Council, trading as Cumberland City Council, is a local government area located in the western suburbs of Sydney in the state of New South Wales, Australia. The Council was formed on 12 May 2016 from the merger of parts of the Cities of Auburn, Parramatta (Woodville Ward), and Holroyd.

The first Special Meeting of Cumberland Council was held on 19 May 2016 at the Granville Town Hall, and the council currently meets at the Merrylands Administration Centre.

The current mayor is Lisa Lake of the Australian Labor Party, elected on 12 January 2022.

Suburbs and localities in the local government area
Suburbs in the Cumberland City Council area are:

History

Holroyd Council
The area formerly known as the City of Holroyd was first proclaimed in July 1872 as the "Municipal District of Prospect and Sherwood", which became the "Municipality of Prospect and Sherwood" from 1906 and on 11 January 1927 it was renamed the "Municipality of Holroyd" after Arthur Holroyd, the first mayor. From 1 January 1991, city status was granted, becoming the City of Holroyd. Originally located at the Council Chambers in Merrylands West from 1915, the administrative centre of Holroyd was located in the suburb of Merrylands from 1962.

Auburn Council
To the east of Holroyd, the City of Auburn was first proclaimed on 19 February 1892 as the "Borough of Auburn" and became the "Municipality of Auburn" in 1906. On 20 June 1906, the hitherto unincorporated area around Silverwater and Newington was combined into the Municipality of Auburn.

The eastern section of Auburn was originally proclaimed as the Borough of Rookwood on 8 December 1891 and in 1913 Rookwood was renamed "Lidcombe", a portmanteau of the names of the two previous mayors, in an attempt to distance the municipality from the necropolis. On 1 January 1949, with the passing of the Local Government (Areas) Act 1948, the Municipalities of Auburn and Lidcombe were amalgamated to form the new "Municipality of Auburn". In 1993 Auburn Municipal Council became "Auburn Council" and was granted city status in 2008, becoming the "Auburn City Council".

Woodville Ward
The area known as the Woodville Ward of the City of Parramatta until the amalgamations in May 2016, was first incorporated as the "Borough of Granville" on 20 January 1885, which became the "Municipality of Granville" from 1906, and met in the Granville Town Hall when it was completed in 1888.

On 1 January 1949, with the passing of the Local Government (Areas) Act 1948, the municipalities of Granville, Dundas, Ermington and Rydalmere, and Parramatta were amalgamated to form the new "City of Parramatta". Granville municipality became the "Granville Ward" and the council meetings of the new Parramatta City were held at the Granville Town Hall from 1949 until the new administration centre was opened in Parramatta in 1958. In 1995 a reorganisation of Parramatta's wards resulted in Granville Ward being renamed "Woodville Ward" after Woodville Road while the former Granville Municipality suburbs of Harris Park, Rosehill, Telopea, and northern sections of Granville and Clyde, were moved into the Elizabeth Macarthur Ward.

Establishment of Cumberland Council

A 2015 review of local government boundaries by the NSW Government Independent Pricing and Regulatory Tribunal recommended a major reorganisation for the area covered by Auburn, Holroyd and Parramatta councils. The government considered two proposals.

On 12 May 2016, Cumberland Council was proclaimed as a new local government area, combining parts of Auburn City Council (south of the M4 Western Motorway), the Woodville Ward of the Parramatta City Council, and the majority of the Holroyd City Council. The remainder of the Auburn City Council area north of the M4 Western Motorway (including parts of the Sydney Olympic Park) and a small section of Holroyd was merged into the reconstituted City of Parramatta Council.

The former General Manager of Mosman Council (1986–2013), Viv May , who had been serving as the Administrator of the suspended Auburn City Council since February 2016, was appointed as the Administrator, and the long-serving Holroyd General Manager, Merv Ismay, was appointed as interim general manager. The first Special Meeting of Cumberland Council was held on 19 May 2016, at the Granville Town Hall, the historic former seat of the Granville Municipality, which merged with Parramatta in 1949. Subsequent Council meetings alternated between the Merrylands Administration Building and Auburn Civic Centre, until December 2016 when May decided that the Auburn council chambers would be taken over by the Auburn Library, and all council meetings from then to be held at Merrylands.

After undertaking a significant amount of work to rationalise council services and staff, noting that "Auburn had issues with flagrant rezoning, and Holroyd was over-promising and underdelivering, living in a financial fantasy with many of its projects", May's term as Administrator came to an end in September 2017, with the election of the first council. The former Mayor of Holroyd, Greg Cummings, was elected as the inaugural Mayor of Cumberland Council on 27 September 2017.

"City" trading name
On 18 December 2019, the mayor Steve Christou presented a mayoral minute to Council recommending that Cumberland Council begin trading as "Cumberland City Council", by changing the Council's trading name and business registration. The motion was passed 7-7 with the casting vote of the mayor, and the name change to "Cumberland City Council" was implemented from January 2020. However, this did not legally confer city status on the council as it had merely changed the trading name of the council, the legal name as proclaimed in 2016 remains "Cumberland Council", which can only be changed by official proclamation of the Governor in the NSW Government Gazette under section 206 of the Local Government Act, 1993.

Heritage listings 
The Cumberland Council area has a number of heritage-listed sites, including:
 Greystanes, Lower Prospect Canal Reserve
 Guildford, 11-35 Byron Road: Linnwood, Guildford
 Guildford, Frank Street: Guildford West pipehead and water supply canal
 Prospect, Clunies Ross Street: Prospect Hill
 Westmead, 2, 4, 6, and 8 Bridge Road: Essington

Demographics
At the  there were  people in the Cumberland local government area, of these 51.4 per cent were male and 48.6 per cent were female. Aboriginal and Torres Strait Islander people made up 0.6 per cent of the population; significantly below the NSW and Australian averages of 2.9 and 2.8 per cent respectively.  The median age of people in the Cumberland local government area was 32 years; significantly lower than the national median of 38 years. Children aged 0 – 14 years made up 20.5 per cent of the population and people aged 65 years and over made up 11.2 per cent of the population. Of people in the area aged 15 years and over, 53.3 per cent were married and 9.8 per cent were either divorced or separated.

Facilities
There are eight libraries located throughout the local government area. There are also five council-run swimming pools. On 9 September 2017 a poll put to the residents by council asked for their views on continuing to run all five pools, given that their operating costs took up 2% of council revenue. The poll returned a result of 74% in favour of continuing council operation of all the pools.

Located partially in the region, the Smithfield-Wetherill Park Industrial Estate is the largest industrial estate in the southern hemisphere and is the centre of manufacturing and distribution in western Sydney, with more than 1,000 manufacturing, wholesale, transport and service firms.

Council
The Cumberland City Council comprises fifteen Councillors elected proportionally, with three Councillors elected in five wards. On 9 September 2017 the first council was elected. The Mayor is elected bi-annually and Deputy Mayor annually by the councillors at the first meeting of the council.

Current composition
The most recent election was held on 4 December 2021, and the makeup of the Council, by order of election, is as follows:

See also

 Local government areas of New South Wales

References

External Links
Cumberland City Council Website

 

Local government areas in Sydney
2016 establishments in Australia